The 1946 Stanford Indians football team was an American football team that represented Stanford University in the Pacific Coast Conference (PCC) during the 1946 college football season. This was the team's first season since 1942 because the team suspended play for three years due to World War II. Stanford's head coach was Marchmont Schwartz, who had coached the 1942 team as well. The team compiled a 6–3–1 record (3–3–1 against PCC opponents) and outscored all opponents by a total of 222 to  147. 

Two Stanford players received first-team honors from the Associated Press (AP) and United Press on the 1946 All-Pacific Coast football team: fullback Lloyd Merriman (AP-1, UP-1) and guard Bill Hachten (AP-1, UP-1). Merriman ranked first in the PCC and 12th nationally with 672 net rushing yards on 142 carries, an average of 4.8 yards per carry.

The team played its home games at Stanford Stadium in Stanford, California.

Schedule

After the season

The 1947 NFL Draft was held on December 16, 1946. The following Indians were selected.

References

Stanford
Stanford Cardinal football seasons
Stanford Indians football